Lipiński (feminine Lipińska, plural Lipińscy) is a Polish surname. Notable persons with the name include:

Adam Lipiński (born 1956), Polish politician
Anatoly Ivanovich Lipinsky (born 1959), Russian military leader
Bill Lipinski (born 1937), Polish-American politician
Christopher A. Lipinski, originator of Lipinski's rule of five to evaluate druglikeness
Dan Lipinski (born 1966), Polish-American politician
Dariusz Lipiński (born 1955), Polish politician
Edward Lipiński (economist) (1888-1986), Polish economist
Jacek Lipiński (born 1966), Polish politician
Karol Lipiński (1790-1861), Polish violinist and composer
Krzysztof Lipiński (born 1984), Polish athlete
Patrick Lipinski (born 1998), Australian athlete
Piotr Lipiński (born 1979), Polish athlete
Tara Lipinski (born 1982), Polish-American figure-skater
Edmund Wnuk-Lipiński (born 1944), Polish sociologist
Wacław Lipiński (1896–1949), Polish soldier and historian
Vyacheslav Lypynsky (Polish: Wacław Lipiński), Ukrainian historian of Polish origin

See also
Lepenski Vir, Mesolithic archaeological site in Serbia

Polish-language surnames